The women's Over 70 kg (+154 lbs) Light-Contact category at the W.A.K.O. World Championships 2007 in Belgrade was the heaviest of the female Light-Contact tournaments being the equivalent of the super heavyweight division when compared to the Low-Kick and K-1 weight classes.  There were five women taking part in the competition, all based in Europe.  Each of the matches was three rounds of two minutes each and were fought under Light-Contact rules.   

Due to the low number of competitors unsuitable for a tournament designed for eight, two women had byes through to the semi finals.  The tournament was won by Russia's Oxana Kinakh who defeated Hungarian Barbara Kovacs in the final by split decision.  Ireland's Diana Cambell and Germany's Natali John won bronze medals.

Results

Key

See also
List of WAKO Amateur World Championships
List of WAKO Amateur European Championships
List of female kickboxers

References

External links
 WAKO World Association of Kickboxing Organizations Official Site

Kickboxing events at the WAKO World Championships 2007 Belgrade
2007 in kickboxing
Kickboxing in Serbia